Norderstedt is a city in Germany and part of the Hamburg Metropolitan Region, the fifth largest city (with approximately 80,000 inhabitants) in the federal state of Schleswig-Holstein, belonging to the district Segeberg.

History
Norderstedt was created by the merger of four villages on 1 January 1970: the villages of Friedrichsgabe and Garstedt, both belonging to the district Pinneberg, and the villages of Glashütte and Harksheide, both belonging to the district Stormarn. The newly created city was assigned to the district Segeberg.

Location
Norderstedt is the southernmost city of district Segeberg, bordering with Hamburg in the south and forms part of Hamburg agglomeration.

Transport and logistics
Norderstedt is served by the Autobahn (federal motorway) A 7/E 45 via exit number 23 Hamburg-Schnelsen-Nord (Norderstedt-Süd), located on Hamburg territory, in the southwest, and exit number 21 Quickborn in the northwest. Major thoroughfares are the federal highways B 432 in west-east and B 433 in north-south directions.

The closest airport is that of Hamburg (IATA airport code HAM), whose runway 33 extends across the state border into Norderstedt.

Norderstedt does not have a Deutsche Bahn railway station. A north-south railway service with commuter trains runs between Ulzburg Süd in the north and Norderstedt Mitte in the south. Norderstedt Mitte is also the northern terminus of the Hamburg underground line U 1. Travel time from Hamburg Central Station to Norderstedt Mitte is 40 minutes. The other two stations of the U 1 line in the city of Norderstedt are Richtweg and Garstedt.

Norderstedt is covered by the postal codes 22844, 22846, 22848, 22850 and 22851. The UN LOCODE abbreviation for Norderstedt is DENOT.

Twin towns – sister cities

Norderstedt is twinned with:
 Kohtla-Järve, Estonia (1989)
 Maromme, France (1966)
 Oadby and Wigston, England, United Kingdom (1977)
 Zwijndrecht, Netherlands (1981)

Notable people

Armin von Gerkan (1881–1969), Baltic German classical archaeologist, lived and died there
Ernst Bader (1914–1999), actor, composer and songwriter, lived and died there
Uwe Seeler (1936–2022), footballer, lived and died there
Oliver Bendt (born 1946), singer and founder of Goombay Dance Band, lives there
Tom Shaka (born 1953), American singer-songwriter, lives there
Human Nikmaslak (born 1976), German-Iranian kick boxer

References

External links
 

Towns in Schleswig-Holstein
Segeberg